Christopher Batt may refer to:

Chris Batt (born 1956), Australian politician
Christopher Batt (cricketer) (born 1976), English cricketer